Mangal Pandey was an Indian soldier who played a key part in the events immediately preceding the outbreak of the Indian rebellion of 1857. He was a sepoy (infantryman) in the 34th Bengal Native Infantry (BNI) regiment of the British East India Company. In 1984, the Indian government issued a postage stamp to remember him. His life and actions have also been portrayed in several cinematic productions.

Early life

Mangal Pandey was born in Nagwa, a village of upper Ballia district, Ceded and Conquered Provinces (now in Uttar Pradesh), to a Hindu Brahmin family.

Mangal Pandey had joined the Bengal Army in 1849. In March 1857, he was a private soldier (sepoy) in the 5th Company of the 34th Bengal Native Infantry.

Mutiny 
On the afternoon of 29 March 1857, Lieutenant Baugh, Adjutant of the 34th Bengal Native Infantry, then stationed at Barrackpore was informed that several men of his regiment were in an excited state. Further, it was reported to him that one of them, Mangal Pandey, was pacing in front of the regiment's guard room by the parade ground, armed with a loaded musket, calling upon the men to rebel and threatening to shoot the first European that he set eyes on. Testimony at a subsequent enquiry recorded that Pandey, unsettled by unrest amongst the sepoys and intoxicated by the narcotic bhang, had seized his weapons and run to the quarter-guard building upon learning that a detachment of British soldiers was disembarking from a steamer near the cantonment.

Baugh immediately armed himself and galloped on his horse to the lines. Pandey took position behind the station gun, which was in front of the quarter-guard of the 34th, took aim at Baugh and fired. He missed Baugh, but the bullet struck his horse in the flank bringing both the horse and its rider down. Baugh quickly disentangled himself and, seizing one of his pistols, advanced towards Pandey and fired. He missed. Before Baugh could draw his sword, Pandey attacked him with a talwar (a heavy Indian sword) and closing with the adjutant, slashed Baugh on the shoulder and neck and brought him to the ground. It was then that another sepoy, Shaikh Paltu, intervened and tried to restrain Pandey even as he tried to reload his musket.

A British Sergeant-Major named Hewson had arrived on the parade ground, summoned by a native officer, before Baugh. He had ordered Jemadar Ishwari Prasad, the Indian officer in command of the quarter-guard, to arrest Pandey. To this, the jemadar stated that his NCOs had gone for help and that he could not take Pandey by himself. In response Hewson ordered Ishwari Prasad to fall in the guard with loaded weapons. In the meantime, Baugh had arrived on the field shouting 'Where is he? Where is he?' Hewson in reply called out to Baugh, 'Ride to the right, sir, for your life. The sepoy will fire at you!' At that point Pandey fired.

Hewson had charged towards Pandey as he was fighting with Lieutenant Baugh. While confronting Pandey, Hewson was knocked to the ground from behind by a blow from Pandey's musket. The sound of the firing had brought other sepoys from the barracks; they remained mute spectators. At this juncture, Shaikh Paltu, while trying to defend the two Englishmen called upon the other sepoys to assist him. Assailed by sepoys who threw stones and shoes at his back, Shaikh Paltu called on the guard to help him hold Pandey, but they threatened to shoot him if he did not let go of the mutineer.

Some of the sepoys of the quarter-guard then advanced and struck at the two prostrate officers. They then threatened Shaikh Paltu and ordered him to release Pandey, whom he had been vainly trying to hold back. However, Paltu continued to hold Pandey until Baugh and the sergeant-major was able to get up. Himself wounded by now, Paltu was obliged to loosen his grip. He backed away in one direction and Baugh and Hewson in another, while being struck with the butt ends of the guards' muskets.

In the meantime, a report of the incident had been carried to the commanding officer General Hearsey, who then galloped to the ground with his two officer sons. Taking in the scene, he rode up to the guard, drew his pistol and ordered them to do their duty by seizing Mangal Pandey. The General threatened to shoot the first man who disobeyed. The men of the quarter-guard fell in and followed Hearsey towards Pandey. Pandey then put the muzzle of the musket to his chest and discharged it by pressing the trigger with his foot. He collapsed bleeding, with his regimental jacket on fire, but not mortally wounded.

Pandey recovered and was brought to trial less than a week later. When asked whether he had been under the influence of any substances, he stated steadfastly that he had mutinied on his own accord and that no other person had played any part in encouraging him. He was sentenced to death by hanging, along with Jemadar Ishwari Prasad, after three Sikh members of the quarter-guard testified that the latter had ordered them not to arrest Pandey.

Mangal Pandey's execution took place on 8 April. Jemadar Ishwari Prasad was executed by hanging on 21 April.

Aftermath

The 34th B.N.I. Regiment was disbanded "with disgrace" on 6 May as a collective punishment, after an investigation by the government, for failing to perform their duty in restraining a mutinous soldier and their officer. That came after a period of six weeks while petitions for leniency were examined in Calcutta. Sepoy Shaikh Paltu was promoted to havildar (sergeant) for his behavior on 29 March but he was murdered in an isolated part of the Barrackpore cantonment shortly before the regiment was disbanded.

The Indian historian Surendra Nath Sen notes that the 34th B.N.I. had a good recent record and that the Court of Enquiry had not found any evidence of a connection with unrest at Berhampore involving the 19th B.N.I. four weeks before (see below). However, Mangal Pandey's actions and the failure of the armed and on-duty sepoys of the quarter-guard to take action convinced the British military authorities that the whole regiment was unreliable. It appeared that Pandey had acted without first taking other sepoys into his confidence but that antipathy towards their British officers within the regiment had led most of those present to act as spectators, rather than obey orders.

Motivation
The personal motivation behind Mangal Pandey's behaviour remains confused. During the incident itself he shouted to other sepoys: "come out – the Europeans are here"; "from biting these cartridges we shall become infidels" and "you sent me out here, why don't you follow me". At his court-martial, he stated that he had been taking bhang and opium, and was not conscious of his actions on 29 March.

There were a wide range of factors causing apprehension and mistrust in the Bengal Army immediately prior to the Barrackpore event. Pandey's reference to cartridges is usually attributed to a new type of bullet cartridge used in the Enfield P-53 rifle which was to be introduced in the Bengal Army that year. The cartridge was thought to be greased with animal fat, primarily from cows and pigs, which could not be consumed by Hindus and Muslims respectively (the former a holy animal of the Hindus and the latter being abhorrent to Muslims). The cartridges had to be bitten at one end before use. The Indian troops in some regiments were of the opinion that this was an intentional act of the British, with the aim of defiling their religions.

Colonel S. Wheeler of the 34th B.N.I. was known as a zealous Christian preacher. The wife of Captain William Halliday of the 56th B.N.I. had the Bible printed in Urdu and Hindi and distributed among the sepoys, thus raising suspicions amongst them that the British were intent on converting them to Christianity.

The 19th and 34th Bengal Native Infantry were stationed at Lucknow during the time of the annexation of Oudh in 1856 because of alleged misgovernment by the Nawab. The annexation had negative implications for sepoys in the Bengal Army (a significant portion of whom came from that princely state). Before the annexation, these sepoys had the right to petition the British Resident at Lucknow for justice — a significant privilege in the context of native courts. As a result of the East India Company's action, they lost that special status, since Oudh no longer existed as a nominally independent political entity.

The 19th B.N.I. is important because it was the regiment charged with testing the new cartridges on 26 February 1857. However, right up to the mutiny the new rifles had not been issued to them, and the cartridges in the magazine of the regiment were as free of grease as they had been through the preceding half-century. The paper used in wrapping the cartridges was of a different colour, arousing suspicions. The non-commissioned officers of the regiment refused to accept the cartridges on 26 February. This information was conveyed to the commanding officer, Colonel William Mitchell; he took it upon himself to try to convince the sepoys that the cartridges were no different from those they had been accustomed to and that they need not bite it. He concluded his exhortation with an appeal to the native officers to uphold the honour of the regiment and a threat to court-martial such sepoys as refused to accept the cartridge. However, the next morning the sepoys of the regiment seized their bell of arms (weapons store). The subsequent conciliatory behaviour of Mitchell convinced the sepoys to return to their barracks.

Court of Enquiry
A Court of Enquiry was ordered which, after an investigation which lasted nearly a month, recommended the disbanding of the 19th B.N.I. The same was carried out on 31 March. The 19th B.N.I. were allowed to retain items of uniform and were provided by the government with allowances to return to their homes. Both Colonel Mitchell of the 19th B.N.I. and (subsequent to the incident of 29 March) Colonel Wheeler of Pandey's 34th B.N.I. were declared unsuited to take charge of any new regiments raised to replace the disbanded units.

Consequences
The attack by and punishment of Pandey is widely seen as the opening scene of what came to be known as the Indian Rebellion of 1857. Knowledge of his action was widespread amongst his fellow sepoys and is assumed to have been one of the factors leading to the general series of mutinies that broke out during the following months. Mangal Pandey would prove to be influential for later figures in the Indian Nationalist Movement like V.D. Savarkar, who viewed his motive as one of the earliest manifestations of Indian Nationalism. Modern Indian nationalists portray Pandey as the mastermind behind a conspiracy to revolt against the British, although a recently published analysis of events immediately preceding the outbreak concludes that "there is little historical evidence to back up any of these revisionist interpretations".

During the rebellion that followed, Pandee or Pandey became the derogatory term used by British soldiers and civilians when referring to a mutinous sepoy. This was a direct derivation from the name of Mangal Pandey.

Film, stage and literature
A film based on the sequence of events that led up to the mutiny entitled Mangal Pandey: The Rising starring Indian actor, Aamir Khan along with Rani Mukerji, Amisha Patel and Toby Stephens, directed by Ketan Mehta was released on 12 August 2005.

The life of Pandey was the subject of a stage play titled The Roti Rebellion, which was written and directed by Supriya Karunakaran. The play was organized by Sparsh, a theatre group, and presented in June 2005 at The Moving Theatre at Andhra Saraswat Parishad, Hyderabad, Andhra Pradesh.

Samad Iqbal, a fictional descendant of Mangal Pandey, is a central character in Zadie Smith's debut novel White Teeth. Pandey is an important influence on Samad's life and is repeatedly referenced and investigated by the novel's characters.

Commemoration

The Government of India commemorated Pandey by issuing a postage stamp bearing his image on 5 October 1984. The stamp and the accompanying first-day cover were designed by Delhi-based artist C. R. Pakrashi.

A park named Shaheed Mangal Pandey Maha Udyan has been set up at Barrackpore to commemorate the place where Pandey attacked British officers and was subsequently hanged.

See also
 Barrackpore Mutiny of 1824
 Pandey
 Bahadur Shah II

References

Cited sources

Further reading
 Amin, Agha H.,  The Sepoy Rebellion of 1857-59: Reinterpreted, 1998, Strategicus and Tacticus
 Mukherjee, Rudrangshu, Mangal Pandey: Brave Martyr or Accidental Hero?, 2005, Penguin Books (India),

External links

 Man who led the mutiny

Revolutionaries of the Indian Rebellion of 1857
1857 deaths
People from Ballia district
British East India Company Army soldiers
People executed by British India by hanging
1827 births
Prisoners and detainees of British India
19th-century executions by British India
Barrackpore
Indian independence activists from Uttar Pradesh
Indian independence armed struggle activists